Lorenzo Manuel Silva Amador (born 7 June 1966 in Carabanchel, Madrid) is a Spanish award-winning writer.
After earning a law degree at the Universidad Complutense of Madrid, he worked as a lawyer from 1992 to 2002.

He has written stories, articles and literary essays, but he is recognised primarily for his novels. One such novel, El alquimista impaciente, won the Nadal Prize in 2000, and filmed by the director Patricia Ferrera, premiering in 2002. This is the second novel in which two of his best known characters, the Guardia Civil agents Sergeant Bevilacqua and Corporal Chamorro, make an appearance. Another of his novels, La flaqueza del bolchevique, was the runner-up for the prize in 1997, and has been adapted into a movie by Manuel Martín Cuenca. The same novel was translated into English in 2013 with the title The Faint-Hearted Bolshevik.

In 2001, Silva conducted an interactive experiment of novel-writing through the website of Círculo de Lectores, in which he proposed for each chapter three possible endings that were put to popular vote. The experiment was a success, and the resulting novel, La isla del fin de la suerte, was published in traditional format.

In October 2012, he was awarded the Premio Planeta de Novela for La Marca del meridiano.

Works

Novels 
 
 
  
  First volume in the Bevilacqua series
 
 
  Second volume in the Bevilacqua series
 
 
  Third volume in the Bevilacqua series
  
  Fourth volume in the Bevilacqua series
  Fifth volume in the Bevilacqua series
 
 
  Sixth volume in the Bevilacqua series
 
  Seventh volume in the Bevilacqua series.

Short Stories

Non Fiction

Children's and Young Adult Fiction

Honours
 La flaqueza del bolchevique - Short-listed for the Premio Nadal, 1997.
 El lejano país de los estanques - Winner of El Ojo Crítico, 1998.
 El alquimista impaciente - Winner of the Premio Nadal, 2000.
 Laura y el corazón de las cosas - Winner of the Premio Destino Infantil-Apel·les Mestres, 2002.
 Carta blanca - Winner of Premio Primavera de Novela, 2004.
 Sereno en el peligro - Winner of Premio Algaba de Ensayo, 2010.
 La marca del meridiano - Winner of Premio Planeta de Novela, 2012.

References

External links
Writer's home page
Forum about the writer
La flaqueza del bolchevique (fragment and review)
La sustancia interior (fragment and review)
Interview of Lorenzo Silva in Anika Entre Libros

1966 births
Living people
Writers from Madrid
Spanish novelists
Spanish male novelists
Complutense University of Madrid alumni